The Corridor II is one of the Pan-European corridors. It runs between Berlin in Germany, and Nizhny Novgorod in Russia, passing through Poland and Belarus. The corridor follows the route: Berlin - Poznań - Warsaw - Brest - Minsk - Smolensk - Moscow - Nizhny Novgorod.

Due to the Schengen Agreement, the border between Germany and Poland can be crossed easily without any passport or immigrations checks. There is border control when crossing the border from the European Union (Poland) into Belarus near Brest, and citizens of most countries need a visa to enter one country or the other, or both. On the Belarus–Russia border, however, there are no immigration checks, because Russia and Belarus are part of the same Union State.

Rail traffic along this route is hindered by a break of gauge at the border between Poland and Belarus. Poland (along with the rest of Western and Central Europe) uses standard-gauge, while Belarus, Russia, and the former Soviet Union use Russian gauge.

References

02
Roads in Belarus
Roads in Germany
Roads in Russia
Roads in Poland